René Eespere (born 14 December 1953 in Tallinn) is an Estonian composer. Eespere's music is noted for its spiritual dimension; he has also incorporated elements from pop music . His best-regarded works are Glorificatio (1990) and Two Jubilations (1995), both written for mixed chorus.

References

1953 births
Living people
Estonian classical composers
20th-century classical composers
21st-century classical composers
Musicians from Tallinn
Tallinn Music High School alumni
Male classical composers
Estonian Academy of Music and Theatre alumni
Academic staff of the Estonian Academy of Music and Theatre
Moscow Conservatory alumni
20th-century Estonian composers
21st-century Estonian composers
20th-century male musicians
21st-century male musicians
Recipients of the Order of the White Star, 4th Class